Al Khawkhah District is a district of the Al Hudaydah Governorate, Yemen. As of 2003, the district had a population of 33,764 inhabitants.

References

External Links
Photos of al-Khawkhah at the American Center of Research

Districts of Al Hudaydah Governorate